Barry Stephen Lewis (July 4, 1945 – January 12, 2021) was an architectural historian, author, educator, New York City tour guide, and television show host.

Biography
Lewis was the grandson of Louis Lewis, the owner and founder of Lewis in Woodhaven. 
He studied at the University of California, Berkley, the Sorbonne, the Hebrew University of Jerusalem, and the New School of Research.

Lewis lead his first tours in the 1970s as a private tour guide and through the 92nd Street Y. PBS asked him to host “A Walk Down 42nd Street” with David Hartman. The show evolved to become “Walking Tour” from 1998–2004. The show was nominated for Emmy Awards several times. He taught at Cooper Union, the New York Historical Society, and the New School of Interior Design. His books and work were recognized by the Landmarks Preservation Society and the New York City American Institute of Architects. He also led virtual tours of New York on C-Span.

He died from heart failure.

Books 
Lewis was a chapter contributor to the Berlitz Guide to New York (2014)

He wrote: New York Walks (2007) and Kew Gardens: Urban Village in the Big City (1999)

References 

1945 births
2021 deaths
Burials at Beth David Cemetery
Cooper Union faculty